Electoral district of Moonee Ponds was an electoral district of the Legislative Assembly in the Australian state of Victoria.

Moonee Ponds was created in the redistribution of 1945, in which several districts were abolished including the Electoral district of Flemington. Moonee Ponds was abolished in the 1976 redistribution, Electoral district of Ascot Vale was created.

Members for Moonee Ponds

Election results

References

Former electoral districts of Victoria (Australia)
1945 establishments in Australia
1976 disestablishments in Australia